Sindbad & the 7 Galaxies (also stylized Sindbad & The 7 Galaxies or SINDBAD 7 GALAXIES or simply Sindbad) is an animated children's comedy adventure TV series created by Raja Masilamani and IP owned by Creative Media Partners.

It is broadcast on Discovery Kids, MBC3, Primo TV, Sun TV, and Be.Television.

The series aimed at age 6-11 follows the adventures of Sindbad and his friends saving the 7 Galaxies from disaster, after school.

Characters
Sindbad: the brown-haired central protagonist of the series. Any time someone says the word "bad" he has to chime in and say "SIND bad"
Lee: the black-haired robotic (cybernetic organism to be exact) engineer appointed to serve Sindbad
Zachary Guthrie: the only Earthling member of the crew, who met Sindbad while he was briefly living on Earth. He has blonde hair.
Lana: a shape-shifter who Sindbad and Zach rescue from her exploding homeworld, as shown in the opening cinematic and a flashback episode. In her humanoid form she has blonde hair like Zach, but can shapeshift into things like a lamp or octopus.

Broadcast
Sindbad is the shortened title used by Toonavision when they began broadcasting it in January 2020. The extended portion of the title "and the seven galaxies" was not included in TV guides.

Episodes
The Race
Planet Gadget
Less is More
All Aboard
Game On
Shapeshifter
See the Problem
Double Trouble
Let's Get Kraken
I Lee
Trash Planet
Smells Like Trouble
Team Awesome
Space-whale
King Zac
Top Turtle
More Than a Mouthful
Stitch in Time
Volcano
Wink of an Eye
The Maltese Kuil
Me-Tal Magnet
Hot Water
The Librarian
Stitch in Time
Genesis

References

External links
 

2010s animated television series
British children's animated adventure television series
British children's animated comedy television series
Sun TV original programming
2016 British television series debuts